The 2011–12 season will be the 71st season in Levante's history and their second consecutive season in La Liga.

With new manager Juan Ignacio Martínez, the club aims to stay in the top flight of Spanish football for another season. Levante will compete in the 2011–12 La Liga and the 2011–12 Copa del Rey where they will enter in the Round of 32.

Current squad

Squad information
Updated 26 January 2012

Transfers

In

Out

Statistics

Team Stats

 

 

 
|}
Updated 27 January.

Discipline

Updated 29 January

Competitions

Pre-season
Kickoff times are in CET.

La Liga

League table

Results summary

Results by round

Matches

Kickoff times are in CET.

Copa del Rey

Kickoff times are in CET.

Round of 32

Round of 16

Quarter-finals

References

External links
Levante UD official website

Levante UD seasons
Levante UD season